Boukacem is a surname. Notable people with the surname include:

 Boualem Boukacem (born 1957), Algerian artist
 Khaled Boukacem (born 1985), Algerian footballer

Arabic-language surnames